Charles Francis Copley (September 1, 1887 – May 29, 1944) was a professional football player who played for the Akron Pros and the Milwaukee Badgers of the National Football League (NFL). He played college football at Muhlenberg College and Missouri University of Science and Technology.

Career
He was also a former teammate of Fritz Pollard during his time with the Pros and the Badgers. In 1923 Charles became the coach of the Gilberton Cadamounts. This caused Copley to recruit Pollard to play for Gilberton, making Pollard the first African-American to play football in Pennsylvania's coal region. In 1917, Copley played alongside Bob Nash for the Massillon Tigers. The Tigers played in the "Ohio League", which was the direct predecessor to the NFL.

References

1887 births
1944 deaths
Akron Pros players
Milwaukee Badgers players
Players of American football from Pennsylvania
Gilberton Cadamounts players
Massillon Tigers players
Muhlenberg Mules football players
Missouri S&T Miners football players